Chaetostomella cylindrica is a species of tephritid or fruit flies in the genus Chaetostomella of the family Tephritidae.

Distribution
United Kingdom & Scandinavia East to Kazakhstan, South to North Africa, Turkey & Afghanistan.

References

Tephritinae
Insects described in 1830
Diptera of Asia
Diptera of Europe
Articles containing video clips